"On a Level" is a single from English grime artist Wiley, produced by longtime collaborator Skepta. It is the first official single released from Wiley's tenth studio album Snakes & Ladders.

The song intentionally recalls the eskibeat style of the material on Wiley's early white label releases and debut album Treddin' on Thin Ice, it was made after Skepta suggested Wiley return to his "original element".

Music video 
The music video was directed by Skepta and premiered on the website of Complex on 24 September 2014. The video was set in an English country mansion and begins with a clip of eskibeat instrumental The Morgue which was released by Wiley on white label in 2003. It features cameos from various prominent UK MCs including Boy Better Know, Giggs, Stormzy and Novelist all dressed in black.

Track listings
 Digital download
 "On a Level" – 3:02

Credits and personnel 
 Lead vocals – Wiley
 Producer – Skepta
 Lyrics – Richard Cowie
 Label: Big Dada

Release history

References 

2014 singles
Wiley (musician) songs